Tomás may refer to:

 Tomás (given name)
 Tomás (surname)